Akhmed Bataev (born 23 September 1991) is a Russian-born Bulgarian wrestler of Chechen origin. He won the silver medal in the 92 kg event at the 2022 European Wrestling Championships held in Budapest, Hungary.

Career 

Early in his career, he represented Russia and he switched to represent Bulgaria in 2020. 

In 2020, he won one of the bronze medals in the men's 97 kg event at the Individual Wrestling World Cup held in Belgrade, Serbia.

In March 2021, he competed at the European Qualification Tournament in Budapest, Hungary hoping to qualify for the 2020 Summer Olympics in Tokyo, Japan. In May 2021, he failed to qualify for the Olympics at the World Qualification Tournament held in Sofia, Bulgaria. He competed in the 97 kg event at the 2021 World Wrestling Championships held in Oslo, Norway.

He competed in the 92kg event at the 2022 World Wrestling Championships held in Belgrade, Serbia.

Achievements

References

External links 

 

Living people
1991 births
People from Khasavyurt
Bulgarian male sport wrestlers
Russian male sport wrestlers
European Wrestling Championships medalists
21st-century Bulgarian people
21st-century Russian people